Aspisheim is an Ortsgemeinde – a municipality belonging to a Verbandsgemeinde, a kind of collective municipality – in the Mainz-Bingen district in Rhineland-Palatinate, Germany.

Geography

Location 
Aspisheim lies in Rhenish Hesse between Mainz and Bad Kreuznach. The municipality is administered by the Verbandsgemeinde of Sprendlingen-Gensingen, whose seat is in Sprendlingen.

Politics

Municipal council 
The council is made up of 13 council members, counting the part-time mayor, with seats apportioned thus:

 FWG = Freie Wählergruppe Aspisheim e.V.

Coat of arms 
The municipality's arms might be described thus: Per pale Or a yarn swift sable palewise and sable a lion rampant Or armed argent and langued gules.

Culture and sightseeing

Regular events 
On the next-to-last weekend in August the municipality's residents stage the Rothesfest, a wine and street festival.

Economy and infrastructure

Transport 
The municipality is crossed by the L 414 state road . The A 61 motorway runs roughly 4 km away from the municipality.

References

External links 

 Municipality’s official webpage 

Municipalities in Rhineland-Palatinate
Rhenish Hesse
Mainz-Bingen